PlayStation Studios (formerly SCE Worldwide Studios and SIE Worldwide Studios) is a division of Sony Interactive Entertainment (SIE) that oversees the video game development at the studios owned by SIE. The division was established as SCE Worldwide Studios in September 2005 and rebranded as PlayStation Studios in 2020.

History 
On September 14, 2005, Sony Computer Entertainment (SCE), the video game arm of Sony, announced the formation of SCE Worldwide Studios, combining all studios SCE owned at the time. Phil Harrison was appointed as the division's president. Shuhei Yoshida succeeded him in May 2008. When Yoshida moved to lead the indie game development of SIE, Hermen Hulst, previously of SIE's Guerrilla Games studio, became the president of SIE Worldwide Studios in November 2019. The studios productions are generally supported by the Visual Arts Services Group, founded in 2007 in San Diego.

SIE announced the rebranding of the division to PlayStation Studios in May 2020 as part of the introduction of the PlayStation 5, which was released later that year. PlayStation Studios serves as the publishing brand for Sony's first-party development studios, as well as for games developed by studios brought in by Sony in work-for-hire situations.

In 2022, Sony stated half of its first party PlayStation Studios games will be on personal computers (PC) and mobile by 2025. In August 2022, SIE announced the formation of the PlayStation Studios Mobile Division, alongside the acquisition of the company's first mobile development team, Savage Game Studios.

XDev 
XDev, established in 2000 and based in Liverpool, collaborates with independent development studios to publish content for PlayStation platforms. XDev has helped to create and publish titles such as the LittleBigPlanet, Buzz!, MotorStorm and Invizimals series, Super Stardust HD, Heavenly Sword, Heavy Rain, Beyond: Two Souls, Tearaway and Resogun. Partners include Quantic Dream, Magenta Software, Climax Studios, Novarama, Supermassive Games and Sumo Digital. In addition to funding projects, XDev offers production, project management and game design support. Games are supported by community management, online production and outsourcing management facilities. XDev works with marketing and public relations teams to promote and publish games worldwide.

Studios

Former

References

External links 
 

 
First-party video game developers
PlayStation (brand)
Software companies based in Tokyo
Sony Interactive Entertainment
Video game companies established in 2005
Video game development companies
Companies based in San Mateo, California